.kp is the Internet country code top-level domain (ccTLD) for the Democratic People's Republic of Korea (DPRK).  It was created on 24 September 2007.

History
The DPRK applied for the  Internet country code top-level domain (ccTLD) in 2004. ICANN, however, refused because the DPRK did not meet some of the requirements. Another attempt was later made via the Korea Computer Center (KCC) Europe in 2006. The main body of KCC and the DPRK Ambassador to the United Nations petitioned ICANN again. They were refused again for providing insufficient information. A new application was sent in January 2007, and an ICANN delegation visited the country in May. This time, ICANN finally agreed to assign  to the DPRK.

One of the first organizations to adopt a  domain was the Korean Central News Agency (KCNA) in 2009.

Previously, the  domain was managed by the Korea Computer Center (KCC) Europe. A large number of websites were also hosted by KCC Europe in Germany. However, in 2011, management was transferred to the Pyongyang-based Star Joint Venture.

Second-level domains 
Neither the DPRK government agencies nor the central registry have published the second-level domain registration rules. However, according to the using practices shown by the currently existing and accessible DPRK domains and websites, while regarding the worldwide country code second-level domain distribution rules, the second-level domain rules in the DPRK can be interpreted as below.

 ac.kp : Academy institutes
 aca.kp : Academic and research institutes
 co.kp  : Generally commercial organizations
 com.kp : Generally commercial organizations and sometimes government information agencies as well
 con.kp : Construction
 edu.kp : Institutions of higher education
 law.kp : Legal firms
 hia.kp :
 inf.kp : Information sites
 org.kp : Industrial associations, civil organizations, and public funds
 gov.kp : Government departments
 ref.kp : Reference works
 rep.kp : Information agencies of the Workers' Party of Korea
 roi.kp :
 net.kp : Internet service providers and email service providers
 sca.kp : Affiliated institutes under the Ministry of Culture (cf. Cabinet of North Korea)

The following are externally accessible domain name examples of the use of second-level domain names:

 aca.kp : mirae.aca.kp
 com.kp : airkoryo.com.kp, knic.com.kp, friend.com.kp
 edu.kp : ryongnamsan.edu.kp, kut.edu.kp, gpsh.edu.kp
 law.kp : fia.law.kp
 org.kp : cooks.org.kp, koredufund.org.kp, kass.org.kp
 gov.kp : mfa.gov.kp, moph.gov.kp, tourismdprk.gov.kp
 rep.kp : rodong.rep.kp, vok.rep.kp, gnu.rep.kp
 net.kp : [Usually appears as the extension for email addresses published elsewhere on other DPRK websites: e.g. @star-co.net.kp]
 sca.kp : korart.sca.kp

Existing and externally accessible domain list
, at least nine second-level domains are active under the  top-level domain and around 30 domains in total are accessible to the global Internet. These are as follows:

Bold indicates a dedicated article on the website itself.

airkoryo.com.kp
cooks.org.kp
dprkportal.kp
fia.law.kp
friend.com.kp
futurere.com.kp
gnu.rep.kp
kass.org.kp
kcna.kp
kftrade.com.kp
kiyctc.com.kp
knic.com.kp
korart.sca.kp
korean-books.com.kp
koredufund.org.kp
korelcfund.org.kp
korfilm.com.kp
korstamp.com.kp
kut.edu.kp
ma.gov.kp
manmulsang.com.kp
masikryong.com.kp
mediaryugyong.com.kp
mfa.gov.kp
minzu.rep.kp
naenara.com.kp
polestar.com.kp
portal.net.kp
pyongyangtimes.com.kp
rodong.rep.kp
ryomyong.edu.kp
ryongnamsan.edu.kp
sdprk.org.kp
silibank.net.kp (Sili Bank, mail server only)
star.net.kp
star-co.net.kp (Star Joint Venture Co. Ltd., mail server only)
star-di.net.kp
tourismdprk.gov.kp
vok.rep.kp
youth.rep.kp

Some  addresses are used by the North Korean Internet only, and some of them are only accessible in the Kwangmyong network, alongside regularly-used 24-bit block IPv4 private addresses.

See also

 Communications in North Korea
 Internet censorship in North Korea
 Internet in North Korea
 List of North Korean websites banned in South Korea
 List of North Korea-related topics
 .kr (top-level domain for the Republic of Korea)
 Kwangmyong (network)

References

External links
 Registration website at Star Joint Venture
 IANA — .kp Domain Delegation Data
 ICANN 2007 announcement of a request to delegate .kp domain
 
 The North Korean Website List at North Korea Tech

Country code top-level domains
Internet in North Korea
Computer-related introductions in 2007

sv:Toppdomän#K